Kafula Ngoie (born 11 November 1945) is a Congolese football midfielder who played for Zaire in the 1974 FIFA World Cup. He also played for TP Mazembe.

References

External links
FIFA profile

1945 births
Africa Cup of Nations-winning players
Democratic Republic of the Congo footballers
Democratic Republic of the Congo international footballers
Association football midfielders
TP Mazembe players
1974 FIFA World Cup players
1965 African Cup of Nations players
1972 African Cup of Nations players
1974 African Cup of Nations players
Living people
21st-century Democratic Republic of the Congo people